Semioptila semiflava is a moth in the Himantopteridae family. It was described by George Talbot in 1928. It is found in the Democratic Republic of the Congo.

References

Moths described in 1928
Himantopteridae